The 22nd Battalion (French Canadian), CEF, was an infantry battalion of the  Canadian Expeditionary Force in the Great War.

History

The battalion was authorized on 7 November 1914 and embarked for Great Britain on 20 May 1915. It disembarked in France on 15 September 1915, where it fought as part of the 5th Infantry Brigade, 2nd Canadian Division in France and Flanders until the end of the war. The battalion was disbanded on 15 September 1920.

The 22nd Battalion recruited in Quebec and was mobilized at Saint-Jean-sur-Richelieu, Quebec.

The 22nd Battalion had six officers commanding:

Col. F.M. Gaudet, 20 May 1915 – 25 January 1916
Lt.-Col. T.L. Tremblay, DSO, 25 January 1916 – 25 September 1916
Lt.-Col. A.E. Dubuc, DSO, 24 October 1916 – 5 February 1917
Lt.-Col. T.L. Tremblay, CMG, DSO, 15 February 1917 – 8 August 1918
Lt.-Col. A.E. Dubuc, DSO, 9 August 1918 – 27 August 1918
Maj. G.P. Vanier, MC, 27 August 1918 – 28 August 1918
Maj. G.E.A. Dupuis, MC, 28 August 1918 – 10 September 1918
Lt.Col. J.R.H. DesRosiers, 10 September 1918 - demobilization

Two members of the 22nd Battalion were awarded the Victoria Cross: Corporal Joseph Kaeble was posthumously awarded the Victoria Cross for his actions on 8 June 1918 at Neuville-Vitasse, France, and  Lieutenant Jean Brillant was posthumously awarded the Victoria Cross for his actions on 8 and 9 August 1918 east of Méharicourt, France, during the Battle of Amiens.

Perpetuation 
The battalion is perpetuated by the Royal 22e Régiment.

Battle Honours 
The 22nd Battalion was awarded the following battle honours:

MOUNT SORREL
SOMME, 1916, '18
FLERS-COURCELETTE
Thiepval
Ancre Heights
ARRAS, 1917, '18
Vimy, 1917
Arleux
Scarpe, 1917, '18
HILL 70
Ypres 1917
Passchendaele
AMIENS
HINDENBURG LINE
Canal du Nord
Cambrai, 1918
PURSUIT TO MONS
FRANCE AND FLANDERS, 1915-18

See also 

 List of infantry battalions in the Canadian Expeditionary Force

References

Sources
 Canadian Expeditionary Force 1914-1919 by Col. G.W.L. Nicholson, CD, Queen's Printer, Ottawa, Ontario, 1962

External links
Photos from Library and Archives Canada

Royal 22nd Regiment
022
Military units and formations of Quebec